Kaarel Nurmsalu (born April 30, 1991) is an Estonian former ski jumper and nordic combined skier.

He won 3 individual bronze medals at the 2011 Nordic Junior World Ski Championships in Otepää.

He holds the national record of Estonia in ski-flying with 213 m.

In June 2014, Nurmsalu announced his retirement from competitive sports, citing lack of funds as the reason behind the decision.

On 11 January 2017, Nurmsalu announced on his Facebook page that he would be returning to active competition starting with the World Cup event in Wisła on 13 January 2017. However, health issues prompted him to end his career for a second time in June 2017.

References

External links

1991 births
Living people
Estonian male ski jumpers
Estonian male Nordic combined skiers
Ski jumpers at the 2014 Winter Olympics
Olympic ski jumpers of Estonia